The 2013 Africa Magic Viewers Choice Awards were held on 9 March 2014 and co-hosted by Big Brother Africa presenter IK Osakioduwa and StarGist’s host, Vimbai Mutinhiri. Ivie Okujaiye and Olu Jacobs were honored with the TrailBlazer and Industry Merit Awards respectively.

References

Entertainment events in Nigeria
2013 in Nigerian cinema
Africa Magic
21st century in Lagos
Africa Magic Viewers' Choice Awards ceremonies